The Lake Cities was a daily passenger train operated by Amtrak between Chicago, Illinois and Toledo, Ohio via Detroit, Michigan. It operated from 1980 until 2004, when it was folded into the Wolverine. It replaced the St. Clair, a Chicago–Detroit train which operated in tandem with the Wolverine. The extension to Toledo gave travelers in Michigan the opportunity to connect with eastbound trains such as the Lake Shore Limited without backtracking to Chicago. Amtrak re-routed the train from Toledo to Pontiac, Michigan in 1995.

History 
The Lake Cities made its first run on August 3, 1980, using the same Turboliner equipment as its predecessor. The connection in Toledo allowed passengers traveling from Michigan to connect with the Lake Shore Limited without backtracking to Chicago. The route between Detroit and Toledo was slow; the Lake Cities required nearly two hours to travel .

Historian Graydon Meints characterized the Toledo service as "disappointing", and Amtrak re-routed the Lake Cities to Pontiac, Michigan in 1995, mirroring the route of the Wolverine and the Twilight Limited. Amtrak estimated yearly losses on the Detroit–Toledo segment at $818,000 and called ridership "stagnant"; a Thruway Motorcoach bus runs in its place.

Proposed restoration

Amtrak proposed to restore the Lake Cities to Toledo as part of its network growth strategy in the late 1990s but ultimately cancelled the project.  it is still not possible to travel by train to or from Michigan without passing through Chicago's Union Station. On April 26, 2004 Amtrak dropped the individual names for the Chicago–Detroit–Pontiac trains, naming them all the "Wolverine."

The Ohio Rail Development Commission proposed restoring service to the Detroit–Toledo corridor as part of its "Ohio Hub" initiative. Under the plan, Detroit would be connected to Ohio by a Detroit–Toledo–Cleveland service (eight trains daily) and potentially also a Detroit–Toledo–Columbus service (eight trains daily).

Notes

References

External links 
The Ohio Hub

Former Amtrak routes
Passenger rail transportation in Illinois
Passenger rail transportation in Michigan
Passenger rail transportation in Ohio
Railway services introduced in 1980
Railway services discontinued in 2004